The American Towers Tower Liverpool is a  guyed tower for FM- and TV-constructions located in Liverpool, Texas.  The American Towers Tower Liverpool was built in 1992 and is property of American Towers, Inc..

References 

Buildings and structures in Brazoria County, Texas
Radio masts and towers in the United States
Towers completed in 1992
Towers in Texas
1992 establishments in Texas